Green lending refers to a lending dependent on environmental criteria for the planned use of funds.  It is part of the wider sustainable investing and aims to reduce the impact on the environment of new lending activities.

History
Starting in 2005 major US banks such as Wells Fargo (July 2005, $1bn over 5 years) and Bank of America (March 2007, $20 bn) started dedicating financing toward sustainable entrepreneurship.  This usually meant financing the building of environmentally sustainable or friendly buildings or enterprises.  The green lending initiative appear to have been taken by the lenders as opposed to borrowers.

In 2018 the Loan Market Association in the UK issued Green Loan Principles to ensure any green loan is used for eligible green projects. This includes stating that this must be clearly articulated in the finance documents along with the expected environmental benefits, which must be assessed, quantified, measured and reported by the borrower.  The list of projects that qualify as green is based on the list that the International Capital Market Association uses to define Green Bonds.

ESG ratings and green loans
In April 2017, Unibail-Rodamco-Westfield put in place a green loan of €650Mn with a banking syndicate led by Lloyds Banking Group as sole co-ordinator and green co-ordinator. This was the first “green” syndicated credit facility in Europe    

URW/LBG was shortly followed by ING Group arranging a sustainability-linked loan to Philips.  Both facilities coupled the interest rate of the loans to the company's sustainability performance, either by reference to an external sustainability ratings, or Key Performance Indicators agreed with the syndicate banks. By June 2018, Bloomberg News reported that ING Group had closed 15 similar deals where the bank would lower the cost of borrowing by between 5% and 10% based on the company's ESG rating provided by Sustainalytics. As shown on Environmental Finance's list of sustainability loans, several other banks have teamed with various ESG ratings agencies.  

In September 2018, five banks, including BBVA, structured a revolving credit facility (RCF) for the Italian power utility A2A in a finance deal valued at 400 million euros. The syndicated loan avails itself of a margin mechanism based on two parameters: the performance of two selected KPIs (waste processing capacity and the volume of renewable energy sold in the wholesale market, emphasizing the focus of the A2A Group on the circular economy and decarbonation). The solicited ESG rating is provided annually by Standard Ethics Aei.

See also 
 Green economy
 Green money (disambiguation)
 Ethical banking

References 

Environmental economics
Environmentalism
Ethical banking
Green politics